The Secretary General was head of the Secretariat of the Organisation of African Unity.

List

References

African Union-related lists
African Union officials